The 2014 Dockerty Cup was a football (soccer) knockout-cup competition held between men's clubs in Victoria, Australia in 2014, the annual edition of the Dockerty Cup.  Victorian soccer clubs from the 5 State League Divisions, regional, metros and masters leagues - plus the 12 Clubs from the National Premier Leagues Victoria - competed for the Dockerty Cup trophy.

This knockout competition was won by Melbourne Knights, their 9th title.

The competition also served as Qualifying Rounds for the 2014 FFA Cup. In addition to the two Victorian A-League clubs, the four semi-finalists qualified for the final rounds of the 2014 FFA Cup, entering at the Round of 32.

Note:  †–After extra time

Format

First round
A total of 70 teams took part in this stage of the competition, which was open to teams from the Victorian State League Division 5, regional, metros and masters leagues. Teams were seeded in terms of which round they would enter based on their division in 2013. Tiers in the table refer to the current (2014) division, after a major reorganization of the Victorian competition structure. A total of 10 teams were given a Bye to the Second Round. Matches in this round were played on 1–4 March 2014.

 Bye–Brighton Firsts, Bundoora United, Chelsea, Harrisfield Hurricanes, Keilor Wolves, Kings Domain, Lara, Noble Park, Parkmore, White Star Dandenong.

Second round
A total of 112 teams took part in this stage of the competition. 72 Clubs from the clubs from the Victorian State League Division 4 and Division 3 entered into the competition at this stage. Teams were seeded in terms of which round they would enter based on their division in 2013. Tiers in the table refer to the current (2014) division. Matches in this round were played on 7–9 March 2014.

Third round
A total of 80 teams took part in this stage of the competition. 24 Clubs from the Victorian State League Division 2 entered into the competition at this stage. Teams were seeded in terms of which round they would enter based on their division in 2013. Tiers in the table refer to the current (2014) division. Matches in this round were played on 14–22 March 2014.

Fourth round
A total of 64 teams took part in this stage of the competition. 12 Clubs from the National Premier Leagues Victoria and 12 Clubs from the Victorian State League Division 1 entered into the competition at this stage. Teams were seeded in terms of which round they would enter based on their division in 2013. Tiers in the table refer to the current (2014) division. Matches in this round were played on 20 March – 15 April 2014.

Fifth Round
A total of 32 teams took part in this stage of the competition. Matches in this round were played on 17 April – 14 May 2014.

Sixth Round
A total of 16 teams took part in this stage of the competition. Matches in this round were played on 28 May – 4 June 2014.

Quarter finals
A total of 8 teams took part in this stage of the competition. The four victorious teams in this round also qualified for the 2014 FFA Cup Round of 32. Matches in this round were played on 11–25 June 2014.

Semi finals
A total of four teams took part in this stage of the competition. The two victorious teams in this round qualified for the 2014 Dockerty Cup Final.

Final
The Final was played at the neutral venue of Lakeside Stadium on 31 August.

References

Dockerty Cup